Tish is a feminine given name and a nickname, frequently for Letitia or variations thereof.  Tish is also an uncommon surname, accounting for around 500 people in the 2000 US Census and 550 in the 2010 US Census, around 95% of whom self-identified as white.

People

Given name 
 Tish of Chaghaniyan, early 8th century ruler of the Principality of Chaghaniyan
 Letitia Baldrige (1926–2012), American etiquette expert and public relations executive, White House Social Secretary for First Lady Jacqueline Kennedy
 Tish Bellomo, former backing vocalist of rock group Blondie
 Tish Ciravolo, bass player and guitar maker
 Tish Cohen (born 1963), Canadian writer 
 Tish Daia (1926-2003), Albanian composer
 Leticia Tish Hinojosa (born 1955), American folksinger
 Tish Howard (born 1946), July 1966 Playboy Playmate of the Month
 Tish Hyman (born 1983), American singer-songwriter and rapper
 Letitia James (born 1958), African-American lawyer, activist and politician, New York City Public Advocate
 George Marsden (boxer) (1911-1980), British boxer
 Tish Pike, later name of Patricia Prain (born 1933), New Zealand alpine skier
 Tish Rabe, American children's book author
 Letitia Tish Sommers (1914-1985), American author and women's rights activist
 Lutitia "Tish" Harrison Warren (born 1979), American author and Anglican priest

Surname 

 Gideon Tish (born 1939), Israeli footballer
 Gyaldem Tish, stagename of Opare Leticia, Ghanaian musician

Fictional characters 
 Letitia Carberry, the protagonist of six novels by Mary Roberts Rinehart
 Petratishkovna "Tish" Katsufrakis, on the animated television series The Weekenders
 Tish Jones, a recurring character in the television series Doctor Who
Morticia Addams, female lead character in The Addams Family

Other uses

 Tish, a gathering of Hasidic Jews

See also
Tisch (disambiguation)
Tisha, a given name
Trish, a given name

References 

Lists of people by nickname